Hell Kettles  is a Site of Special Scientific Interest in the Darlington district of County Durham, England. It was designated for its biological interest as the only site in County Durham where there is a body of water fed by springs.

Location
The site, which lies on the floodplain of the River Tees, to the south of Darlington, is situated alongside the A167, about 1 mile south of the junction of that road with the A66.

Origin
The Kettles are two pools that are the end result of catastrophic subsidence in 1179: the Permian rocks underlying the area include substantial thicknesses of evaporites—gypsum and gypsiferous mudstone—and subsidence resulting from subterranean dissolution of these beds is a frequent occurrence, though the scale of the Hell Kettles subsidence is exceptional. Surface runoff and seepage from calcareous springs has created the two pools, one of which is the only body of spring-fed open water in County Durham: there were originally four subsidence depressions, but one filled in and two are now linked in a pond aptly named 'Double Kettle'.

The name "hell-kettle" is often applied to ponds that are popularly believed to be bottomless; these particular ponds are mentioned in Holinshed's Chronicles:

and, it has been suggested, may have inspired the scene in Lewis Carroll's Alice's Adventures in Wonderland in which Alice tumbles down a rabbit hole.

Ecology
Despite their proximity, the two pools differ ecologically. 'Double Kettle' is fed by surface runoff and its water is turbid, supporting only an impoverished surface vegetation of pondweeds, including the alien Canadian pondweed, Elodea canadensis; it is fringed mainly by common reed, Phragmites australis, with some saw-sedge and common club-rush, Scirpus lacustris.

To the south, the smaller 'Croft Kettle' is fed by calcareous subterranean springs and its clear water supports a luxuriant growth of stoneworts; its fringing swamp is dominated by saw-sedge, Cladium mariscus, creating a vegetation type similar to that of the fens of East Anglia and which is found nowhere else in County Durham.

The area around the ponds is mainly damp grassland, with a rich variety of sedges, Carex spp.

References

Sites of Special Scientific Interest in County Durham